The Battle of Anchialus (Medieval Greek: Μάχη του Αγχίαλου) occurred in 708 near the modern-day town of Pomorie, Bulgaria

Origins of the conflict 
In 705, the Bulgarian Khan, Tervel helped the ex-emperor of Byzantium, Justinian II, regain his throne after 10 years in exile. To show his gratitude, Justinian gave the Bulgarians an enormous quantity of gold, silver, and silk, as well as the "Zagore" area, located between Stara Zagora, Sliven, and the Black Sea. Three years later, Justinian II considered himself strong enough to invade Bulgaria and restore his rule over these lands.

The battle 
The Byzantines reached the Anchialus fortress and set their camp there, unaware of the fact that the Bulgarian army was in the vicinity. While the invaders were gathering food, Tervel and his cavalry charged the outermost Byzantine troops, while at the same time the infantry attacked the camp. 

The Byzantines were surprised and confused; most of them perished in the battle or were captured, as well as many horses and arms. The emperor was one of the very few who managed to reach the fortress and escape to Constantinople on a ship.

Aftermath 
The Bulgarians secured the new territorial gains for centuries. In 711 when a riot and coup attempt forced Justinian II to seek for help, Tervel gave him 3,000 soldiers, who after several skirmishes were given safe conduct to Bulgaria by the new emperor, who had Justinian II executed.

References 
Атанас Пейчев и колектив, 1300 години на стража, Военно издателство, София 1984.
Йордан Андреев, Милчо Лалков, Българските ханове и царе, Велико Търново, 1996.

700s conflicts
Pomorie
8th century in Bulgaria
700s in the Byzantine Empire
Battles involving the First Bulgarian Empire
Battles of the Byzantine–Bulgarian Wars in Thrace
Military history of Bulgaria
History of Burgas Province
Twenty Years' Anarchy
708